Baumstown is a census-designated place in Exeter Township, Berks County, Pennsylvania, United States, located near the borough of Birdsboro. It is located at the junction of U.S. Highway 422 and Pennsylvania Route 345. As of the 2010 census the population of Baumstown was 422 residents.

Demographics

References

Populated places in Berks County, Pennsylvania